In the gravitational two-body problem, the specific orbital energy  (or vis-viva energy) of two orbiting bodies is the constant sum of their mutual potential energy and their total kinetic energy, divided by the reduced mass. According to the orbital energy conservation equation (also referred to as vis-viva equation), it does not vary with time:

where
 is the relative orbital speed;
 is the orbital distance between the bodies;
 is the sum of the standard gravitational parameters of the bodies;
 is the specific relative angular momentum in the sense of relative angular momentum divided by the reduced mass;
 is the orbital eccentricity;
 is the semi-major axis.

For an elliptic orbit the specific orbital energy is the negative of the additional energy required to accelerate a mass of one kilogram to escape velocity (parabolic orbit). For a hyperbolic orbit, it is equal to the excess energy  compared to that of a parabolic orbit. In this case the specific orbital energy is also referred to as characteristic energy.

Equation forms for different orbits
For an elliptic orbit, the specific orbital energy equation, when combined with conservation of specific angular momentum at one of the orbit's apsides, simplifies to:

where
 is the standard gravitational parameter;
 is semi-major axis of the orbit.

For a parabolic orbit this equation simplifies to

For a hyperbolic trajectory this specific orbital energy is either given by

or the same as for an ellipse, depending on the convention for the sign of a.

In this case the specific orbital energy is also referred to as characteristic energy (or ) and is equal to the excess specific energy compared to that for a parabolic orbit.

It is related to the hyperbolic excess velocity  (the orbital velocity at infinity) by

It is relevant for interplanetary missions.

Rate of change

For an elliptic orbit the rate of change of the specific orbital energy with respect to a change in the semi-major axis is

where
 is the standard gravitational parameter;
 is semi-major axis of the orbit.

In the case of circular orbits, this rate is one half of the gravitation at the orbit. This corresponds to the fact that for such orbits the total energy is one half of the potential energy, because the kinetic energy is minus one half of the potential energy.

Additional energy

If the central body has radius R, then the additional specific energy of an elliptic orbit compared to being stationary at the surface is

The quantity  is the height the ellipse extends above the surface, plus the periapsis distance (the distance the ellipse extends beyond the center of the Earth). ,  .

Examples

ISS
The International Space Station has an orbital period of 91.74 minutes (5504s), hence by Kepler's Third Law the semi-major axis of its orbit is 6,738km.

The energy is −29.6MJ/kg: the potential energy is −59.2MJ/kg, and the kinetic energy 29.6MJ/kg. Compare with the potential energy at the surface, which is −62.6MJ/kg. The extra potential energy is 3.4MJ/kg, the total extra energy is 33.0MJ/kg. The average speed is 7.7km/s, the net delta-v to reach this orbit is 8.1km/s (the actual delta-v is typically 1.5–2.0km/s more for atmospheric drag and gravity drag).

The increase per meter would be 4.4J/kg; this rate corresponds to one half of the local gravity of 8.8m/s2.

For an altitude of 100km (radius is 6471km):

The energy is −30.8MJ/kg: the potential energy is −61.6MJ/kg, and the kinetic energy 30.8MJ/kg. Compare with the potential energy at the surface, which is −62.6MJ/kg. The extra potential energy is 1.0MJ/kg, the total extra energy is 31.8MJ/kg.

The increase per meter would be 4.8J/kg; this rate corresponds to one half of the local gravity of 9.5m/s2. The speed is 7.8km/s, the net delta-v to reach this orbit is 8.0km/s.

Taking into account the rotation of the Earth, the delta-v is up to 0.46km/s less (starting at the equator and going east) or more (if going west).

Voyager 1
For Voyager 1, with respect to the Sun:

 = 132,712,440,018 km3⋅s−2 is the standard gravitational parameter of the Sun
r = 17 billion kilometers
v = 17.1 km/s

Hence:

Thus the hyperbolic excess velocity (the theoretical orbital velocity at infinity) is given by

However, Voyager 1 does not have enough velocity to leave the Milky Way. The computed speed applies far away from the Sun, but at such a position that the potential energy with respect to the Milky Way as a whole has changed negligibly, and only if there is no strong interaction with celestial bodies other than the Sun.

Applying thrust

Assume:
a is the acceleration due to thrust (the time-rate at which delta-v is spent)
g is the gravitational field strength
v is the velocity of the rocket

Then the time-rate of change of the specific energy of the rocket is : an amount  for the kinetic energy and an amount  for the potential energy.

The change of the specific energy of the rocket per unit change of delta-v is

which is |v| times the cosine of the angle between v and a.

Thus, when  applying delta-v to increase specific orbital energy, this is done most efficiently if a is applied in the direction of v, and when |v| is large. If the angle between v and g is obtuse, for example in a launch and in a transfer to a higher orbit, this means applying the delta-v as early as possible and at full capacity. See also gravity drag. When passing by a celestial body it means applying thrust when nearest to the body. When gradually making an elliptic orbit larger, it means applying thrust each time when near the periapsis.

When  applying delta-v to decrease specific orbital energy, this is done most efficiently if a is applied in the direction opposite to that of v, and again when |v| is large. If the angle between v and g is acute, for example in a landing (on a celestial body without atmosphere) and in a transfer to a circular orbit around a celestial body when arriving from outside, this means applying the delta-v as late as possible. When passing by a planet it means applying thrust when nearest to the planet. When gradually making an elliptic orbit smaller, it means applying thrust each time when near the periapsis.

If a is in the direction of v:

See also
Specific energy change of rockets
Characteristic energy C3 (Double the specific orbital energy)

References

Astrodynamics
Orbits